Tögrög specifies:
 Mongolian tögrög, the currency of Mongolia
 several Sums (districts) in different Aimags (provinces) of Mongolia:
 Tögrög, Govi-Altai
 Tögrög, Övörkhangai
 Tögrögyn Shiree, a paleolontical site in Mongolia